Insurrection a limited form of rebellion, an armed uprising

Insurrection may also refer to:

Art, entertainment, and media

Films and television
 Insurrection (TV series), a 1966 docudrama broadcast on Telefís Éireann
 Star Trek: Insurrection, a 1998 Star Trek film

Literature
 Insurrection (O'Flaherty novel), a 1950 novel by the Irish novelist Liam O'Flaherty
 Insurrection (Forgotten Realms novel), a 2002 fantasy novel set in the Forgotten Realms universe
 Insurrection (Young novel), the first novel in Robyn Young's Insurrection trilogy
 Insurrection, a 1990 science fiction novel by David Weber and Steve White; part of the Starfire series
 The Coming Insurrection, a 2008 anti-capitalist book written by the left-of-center Invisible Committee

Music
 Insurrection (album), a 2011 album by Molotov Solution
 Live Insurrection, a 2001 live album by heavy metal band Halford
 "Insurrection", a song from German band Gamma Ray's album Land of the Free II

Other art, entertainment, and media
 StarCraft: Insurrection, an expansion for the Blizzard game StarCraft
 WWE Insurrextion, a World Wrestling Entertainment pay-per-view event

History
Siege of Malta (1798–1800), also known as the Maltese Insurrection
1971 JVP insurrection, a Sri Lankan war initiated by the Janatha Vimukthi Peramuna ("People's Liberation Front")
1987–1989 JVP insurrection, a continuation of the 1971 JVP Insurrection
Philippine Insurrection, an alternate name for the Philippine–American War

Philosophy
 Insurrectionary anarchism, a political derivative of anarchism